MOH or Moh may refer to:

Acronyms
 Medal of Honor, the United States' highest and most prestigious personal military decoration
 Medal of Honor (video game series), created by Steven Spielberg
 Medal of Honor (1999 video game)
 Medical Officer of Health, a title commonly used for the senior government official of a health department or agency
 Medication overuse headache, pain occurring when analgesics are taken frequently to relieve headaches
 Metal hydroxide
 Ministry of Health (disambiguation)
 Montgomery High School (San Diego), a public high school
 Music on hold, the business practice of playing recorded music to fill the silence for telephone callers placed on hold

Moh
 Moh, perplexity or confusion as also for the cause of confusion
 Mohu, a village in the Romanian commune of Șelimbăr
 Clarisse Moh (born 1986), French middle-distance runner
 Tzuong-Tsieng Moh, one of the formulators of the Abhyankar–Moh theorem

See also
 MHO (disambiguation)
 Mo (disambiguation)
 Moe (disambiguation)
 Mow (disambiguation)